Imlek a.d. (full legal name: Akcionarsko društvo Industrija mleka i mlečnih proizvoda Imlek Padinska Skela; stylized as imlek) is a Serbian food company based in Belgrade, Serbia. It is specialized in processing milk and produces dairy products.

The company was established in 1953 and owns six production facilities in Serbia, Bosnia and Herzegovina and North Macedonia.

It also owns a brand of juices named Bifruit selling in North Macedonia.

History
In 1953, a dairy plant was built at the farm "Lepušnica" in Glogonjski Rit (rit means "swampy area") between Belgrade and Pančevo. That was the practical establishment of dairy industry Imlek within PKB Corporation. Around 800 cows gave daily between three and five thousand liters of milk which was sent to the Belgrade market. In 1957, UNICEF granted a line for pasteurizing and bottling 30,000 liters of milk per day. In 1963, the production already exceeded 21 million liters a year. The company was the largest dairy industry in SFR Yugoslavia.

In 2004, the "Salford Investment Fund" became the largest shareholder of Imlek.

Imlek through its subsidiary Mlekara Subotica diary became the first Serbian manufacturer of fresh milk products to obtain permission to export to the European Union in 2010.

In February 2015, the investment fund Mid Europa Partners bought "Danube Foods Group" (which at the time owned Imlek a.d. and several other notable Serbian food companies) for a sum of 575 million euros. Later, Mlekara Subotica was merged into Imlek, thus way ceasing its operations; company's facilities in Subotica have since been used by Imlek. Since 2015, assets of Mid Europe Partners in Serbia which include Imlek, Bambi and Knjaz Miloš, are managed by "Moji Brendovi" consultant firm.

In September 2018, a fire broke out in one of Imlek's main facilities, which later caused temporary re-organization of production. As of March 2019, the company owns six production facilities, four facilities in Serbia, one in Bosnia and Herzegovina, and one in North Macedonia.

Subsidiaries
This is a list of subsidiary companies of Imlek:
 Imlek Boka d.o.o. Kotor, Montenegro
 Mljekara a.d. Laktaši, Bosnia and Herzegovina
 Mlijekoprodukt d.o.o. Kozarska Dubica, Bosnia and Herzegovina
 East Milk d.o.o. Sarajevo, Bosnia and Herzegovina
 AD IMB Mlekara Bitola, North Macedonia
 Balkan Dairy Products BV, The Netherlands
 Mljekara Sinj d.o.o. Zagreb, Croatia

References

External links
 

1953 establishments in Serbia
2004 mergers and acquisitions
Dairy products companies of Serbia
Food and drink companies established in 1953
Manufacturing companies based in Belgrade
Serbian brands